Lophognathus horneri is a species of agama found in Australia.

References

Lophognathus
Agamid lizards of Australia
Taxa named by Jane Melville
Taxa named by Stephanie N.J. Chapple
Reptiles described in 2018